The Kamala River (Hindi and  kamalā nadī) originates from Nepal and flows through Indian state of Bihar.

Course
It flows in a southerly direction crossing Kamala Khoj area and after passing through a gorge above Chauphat it flows into the terai area of Nepal at Chisapani. The Kamala forms the border between Siraha and Dhanusa districts in the terai. During the monsoon  the river swells up and thus causes devastating river bank erosion. Tao River and Baijnath Khola River merges with Kamala at Maini

A barrage known as Kamala barrage has been constructed by the State Government near Jainagar. It joins the river Kareh (Bagmati) at Badlaghat in Khagaria district and the combined stream flows into the Koshi nearby. While one of its branches leads to the Bagmati another leads to the Kosi.

In the lower reaches it follows the course of the Balan and is therefore also known as Kamala-Balan.

Tributaries
The main tributaries of the Kamala River are the Tao, Baijnath Khola, Mainawati, Dhauri, Soni, Balan, Trisula, and Chadaha.

River and basin data
The river drains a total catchment area of   out of which   lies in Bihar in India and the rest  in Nepal. Population of the Kamala basin in Bihar is 3.9 million.

Floods
The extent of flood impact can be gauged from the fact that about one million people were affected by floods in the Kamala and other rivers in the region in 2003.

While 16.5 per cent of the total flood affected area in India is in Bihar, 57 per cent of India's flood affected population live in Bihar, out of which 76 per cent are in northern Bihar. Over 70 per cent of the population of North Bihar lives under recurring threat of floods.
  
The plains of Bihar, adjoining Nepal, are drained by a number of rivers that have their catchments in the steep and geologically nascent Himalayas. The Kosi, the Gandak, the Burhi Gandak, the Bagmati, the Kamala Balan and the Adhwara group of rivers originate in Nepal, carry high discharge and very high sediment load and drop it down in the plains of Bihar.

Bihar witnessed high magnitudes of flood in 1978, 1987, 1998, 2004 and 2007.

Three dams have been proposed as solutions to north Bihar's flood problems. Among the three one is across the Kamala at Chisapani, but a report claims that there is no flood cushion in the proposed Chisapani reservoir.

.External link: Glimpses of the flood in Northern Bihar in 2007 (Source: Water Resource Department, Govt. of Bihar)

Kamala Multipurpose Project
The Kamala Multipurpose Project would involve the construction of storage dam on the Kamala River in the districts of Dhanusa and Siraha in Nepal. The project would provide year-round irrigation facilities and generate hydropower with an installed capacity of 30 MW. This scheme forms part of the Sunkosi Storage-cum-Diversion Scheme which involves diverting water from the Sunkosi River to the Kamala River to augment lean season flow.

However, there is a cause for worry. North Bihar is an earthquake prone area. In 1998, earthquake zone was Darbhanga that is only  from the borders of Nepal where big dams are being proposed. In 1988, Kamala River embankment in Madhubani district breached due to earthquake cracks.

References

Rivers of Madhesh Province
Rivers of Bihar
International rivers of Asia
Rivers of India